Heylaa is a 2006 Maldivian crime film written and directed by Moomin Fuad. Produced by Mohamed Samee, the film stars Ismail Rasheed, Ahmed Mauroof and Zeenath Abbas in pivotal roles. Winning five Gaumee Film Awards, the film was also screened at several Film Festivals including the South Asian Film Festival Maldives, 2007.

The film narrates the story of a fourteen-year-old boy who finds himself unknowingly being involved in smuggling of a revolver. Though the film received positive reviews from critics, it was a commercial failure. The film is the first Maldivian film to be shot in high-definition digital video.

Plot
Shuhaadh (Ahmed Mauroof) is a fourteen-year-old boy who has been physically and verbally abused by his father, Ahamma (Ismail Rasheed), who has been recently brought from police custody after being jailed for his involvement in drug deals. Shuhaadh, who mostly is dependent on few of his neighbors including Sobira (Aminath Shareef) and her son Ashraf (Lufshan Shakeeb), meets a mysterious man who offered to save him from his misery. The man assigns him a task, paid him beforehand and he accomplished the task where he finds himself being involved in smuggling of a revolver.

A confused Shuhaadh learns to fire it. The thought of the weapon keeps haunting him all day and he finally reveals it to Ashraf, who guides him to inform the police. Meanwhile, Ahamma was arranging a drug deal at home. Shuhaadh discovers about the deal and tries to save his father by begging him to halt the deal. Furious, Ahamma violently beats Shuhaadh, who ends up shooting and killing his father.

Cast 
 Ismail Rasheed as Ahamma
 Ahmed Mauroof as Shuhaadh
 Zeenath Abbas as Shahula
 Abdulla Muaz as Ayya
 Lufshan Shakeeb as Ashraf
 Aminath Shareef as Sobira
 Koyya Hassan Manik as Mufeed
 Saeedha as Sofi

Soundtrack

Reception
According to director Shifau, the film was a learning project for the team, however the audience response was very underwhelming with less than five hundred people watching the film on screen. He believed that its commercial status was a result of casting "not very prominent" faces in the film and the "film-goers were not ready to accept the genre" at the time of release.

Ahmed Nadheem from Haveeru called the film an "awakening film" from a "drowsed industry". Satisfied with the plot twists and narration, Nadheem wrote: "There always is a lead in its narration. When a scene cuts one another, it has always been followed by a rich dialogue. Though this is directors' first project, one can clearly see their ambition and determination".

Accolades

References

External links 
 

2006 films
2000s crime films
Maldivian crime films
Films directed by Moomin Fuad
Films directed by Ali Shifau